is a private university in Kaizuka, Osaka, Japan. The predecessor of the school was founded in 1997, and it was chartered as a university in 2006.

External links
 Official website 

Educational institutions established in 1997
Private universities and colleges in Japan
Universities and colleges in Osaka Prefecture
1997 establishments in Japan
Kaizuka, Osaka